Lyudmila Petranovskaya  is a Russian psychologist and parenting
expert, specialist in adoption, founder of the School for Adoptive Parents.

She started as a therapist for orphans, with the time she participated in numerous governmental and private initiatives aimed to raise awareness on problems of orphans, educate adoptive parents and moreover, shift the legislation in Russia to more humane treatment of orphaned children. In 2012 she co-founded the Family Development University that offers assistance to adoptive families.

In 2002 Petrsnovskaya was honoured with the Presidential Award in Education. She has published more than 15 books and numerous articles on family psychology.

References

Literature 

Living people
Soviet psychologists
Russian psychologists
Russian women psychologists
1967 births